Gretna Heritage Festival is a culture festival in Gretna, Louisiana.  The festival offers food, arts & crafts, rides & games, and music.

The festival started in 1994 as a small community event.  It has since grown to one of the largest festivals in Jefferson Parish, Louisiana.

Prominent acts have included Travis Tritt, The Beach Boys, Hunter Hayes, Charlie Daniels, Blue Öyster Cult, Joe Diffie, David Allan Coe, Chicago, Brooks & Dunn,  Bonerama,  Theresa Andersson, and Ricky Van Shelton.

The festival's on hiatus until 2021.

External links

Gretna Heritage Festival

Festivals in Louisiana
Cultural festivals in the United States
Recurring events established in 1994
Tourist attractions in Jefferson Parish, Louisiana
1994 establishments in Louisiana